Juniata Woolen Mill and Newry Manor, also known as Lutz Mansion and Woolen Mill, Lux Vista, Lutz Mill, and Lutz Factory, is a historic woolen mill building and manor house located at Snake Spring Township in Bedford County, Pennsylvania. The site includes a small German colonial manor house dated to 1803 with a large brick addition dated to 1858 and an attached log house, and a stone woolen mill dated to 1805.  The original 1803 manor house is a 2 1/2-story, 3-bay wide building.  Attached to it is the 2 1/2-story, late-federal style brick addition, with the early 19th century, 2-story log house attached to it. The log house was reconstructed in 1950. The woolen mill is 2 1/2-stories with four working levels. The mill was in operation from 1808 for over a century.

It was listed on the National Register of Historic Places in 1983.

References

External links

Industrial buildings and structures on the National Register of Historic Places in Pennsylvania
Historic American Engineering Record in Pennsylvania
Houses completed in 1803
Industrial buildings completed in 1805
Buildings and structures in Bedford County, Pennsylvania
Houses in Bedford County, Pennsylvania
1805 establishments in Pennsylvania
National Register of Historic Places in Bedford County, Pennsylvania